Akiba Israel Wertheimer (1778–1835) was the first Chief Rabbi of Altona and Schleswig-Holstein.

Life 
Akiba (or Ekiva or Akiva) Wertheimer was born in Wrocław, Prussia in about 1778. His father was Torah scholar Avigdor Wertheimer (died 1826). Akiba went to the Talmudic academy of Akiba Eger in Mirosławiec, which was one of the most important in the region.

He came with his parents to Altona, now a suburb of Hamburg but which was then an independent city under the administration of the Danish monarchy, where in 1805 he was a Melamed (teacher of Torah and Talmud school). In 1806 he was appointed Rabbi in Moisling and Lübeck.  Due to the expulsion of the Jews in Lübeck and poverty in the Moisling Jewish community, in 1816 he moved to Altona where he remained until his death.

In 1819 he opposed the Hamburg-based reformers of Judaism and banned the use of the Jewish prayer book in the German language.

In 1823 he was appointed the first Chief Rabbi of Altona and Schleswig-Holstein. For the Altona rabbinate, he was successor to Rabbi Mendel Hirsch Frankfurter, the grandfather of Samson Raphael Hirsch.

Akiba Wertheimer died in Altona in 1835, and was succeeded as Chief Rabbi by Jacob Ettlinger.

Family 
Wertheimer had four daughters and four sons:
Betty Wertheimer
Miriam Wertheimer
Hanna Wertheimer
Jakob Wertheimer (1799–??) ∞ Renette Levy
Abraham Hirsch Wertheimer
Meir (Meyer) Wertheimer who emigrated to Birmingham, England, where he changed his name to Martin Wertheimer and became a jeweller
Moses Wertheimer (1807–1887) – Torah scholar and father of German philosopher Constantin Brunner (born Aryeh Yehuda Wertheimer) ∞ Rachel (Rieke) Levy
Jette Wertheimer (1801–1890) ∞ Isaac Joseph Michael (born 1795)

Literature 
Abraham Suhl: Zu Constantin Brunners Biographie. In: Der Constantin Brunner Gedanke.  (To Constantin Brunner's biography. In The Constantin Brunner thought.) Edited by Dr. R. Pinner u. Dr. A. Suhl, Year 1, Issue 3/4, August 1955 pp 21–33

References

1778 births
1835 deaths
Chief rabbis of Poland
Danish rabbis
German Orthodox rabbis